Encores is the debut compilation album by the Christian group 2nd Chapter of Acts. It collects songs from their first two Myrrh Records albums, With Footnotes and In the Volume of the Book.

Track listing

Source(s):

References

2nd Chapter of Acts albums
1981 compilation albums